Mustafa Maluka (born 21 November 1976, Cape Town, South Africa) is an artist and cultural analyst. He is known for theatrically confronting the intersection of contemporary critical theory and global politics with his provocative large-scale portraits.

He grew up in Cape Town, South Africa, but came of age in Amsterdam, the Netherlands where he studied at De Ateliers postgraduate art institute and the Amsterdam School for Cultural analysis at the University of Amsterdam. He currently lives and works in Finland.

Biography
Maluka's work has appeared in several international exhibitions such as the 27th São Paulo Bienal in Brazil,"World Histories" at Des Moines Art Centre, Iowa and "Flow" at the Studio Museum in Harlem.Mustafa Maluka studied at De Ateliers art institute and the University of Amsterdam in the Netherlands and lived in Berlin and New York.  He now lives and works in Turku, Finland. He has been included in international group exhibitions at the Snug Harbor Cultural Center (2010), the Studio Museum in Harlem (2008), Des Moines Art Center (2008), the Stedelijk Museum Zwolle (2006) and the Contemporary Museum of Honolulu (2006). He is part of the collections of Kamel Lazaar Foundation and Sindika Dokolo Foundation among others. Mustafa Maluka recently participated to the group exhibition You Love Me, You Love Me Not at Municipal Gallery in Porto, Portugal (2015) showcasing part of the Sindika Dokolo collection and also in Us Is Them by the Pizzuti Collection, Columbus, USA (2015). In 2009, he made the cover of the first book on African contemporary art, writing by Sue Williamson, a key figure on the South African art scene since the early 1980s.

Book covers
Mustafa Maluka (42 years old) (born 21 November 1976 Cape Town South Africa) is an artist and cultural analyst. He is known for theatrically confronting the intersection of contemporary critical theory and global politics with his provocative large-scale portraits. He grew up in Cape Town South Africa but came of age in Amsterdam the Netherlands where he studied at De Ateliers postgraduate art institute and the Amsterdam School for Cultural analysis at the University of Amsterdam.

Maluka's work has appeared on the covers of various books. Most recently his painting entitled "I can't believe you think that of me" appeared on the cover of the Harper Collins book South African Art Now and one of his photographs on the cover of the social science book "The new media nation: indigenous peoples and global communication". A still from a 2001 interactive piece was used as the cover for the book "Africa and its significant others: forty years of intercultural entanglement". The multiple award-winning novel by Doreen Baingana called "Tropical Fish: Stories Out of Entebbe" was also adorned with 3 covers featuring different works by the artist.

Awards 
 1998 Thami Mnyele Award, Amsterdam
 2004 Tollman Award for the Visual Arts

Selected solo exhibitions
 Hard Living (an ethnomethodological approach), De Ateliers, Amsterdam, The Netherlands (2001, Solo Exhibition)
 The Realness, Galerie Tanya Rumpff, Haarlem, The Netherlands (2002, Solo Exhibition)
 Bad for Your Health/Wrong Colour, Virtual Museum of Contemporary African Art (2002, Solo Exhibition)
 Accented Living: a rough guide, Michael Stevenson, Cape Town, South Africa (2005, Solo Exhibition)
 The Interview (a transcript), Michael Stevenson, Cape Town, South Africa (2007, Solo Exhibition)
 Reflexive Indices: a phenomenological study, Galerie Bertrand & Gruner, Geneva, Switzerland (2007, Solo Exhibition)
 The Message, Galerie Mikael Andersen, Berlin, Germany (2008, Solo Exhibition)
 The Rhetoric of Sincerity / The Sincerity of Rhetoric, Galerie Bertrand & Gruner, Geneva, Switzerland (2009, Solo Exhibition)
 A Place so Foreign, Jack Tilton Gallery, New York, USA (2009, Solo Exhibition)
 Discourse in Translation: a pragmadialectical analysis, Galerie Mikael Andersen, Copenhagen, Denmark (2010, Solo Exhibition)

Exhibitions

Mustafa Maluka - Structural disbelief : an imposition 
Preview on 11 April 2013. Exhibition from 12 April to 1 June 2013. The latest solo show by Mustafa Maluka entitled 'Structural Disbelief: an imposition', deals with the social and political structure of prejudice and the various ways, both subtle and overt, in which people are pre-judged and dismissed because of their appearance. The show tackles the structural disbelief faced by successful, high achieving people who appear as 'others' within particular societies. It also explores fragments of dialogical transaction to which the characters in the paintings are subjected to as individuals who appear as other within the societies that they live in.

References

External links
 Galerie Bertrand and Gruner
 Gallery Mikael Andersen
 Jack Tilton Gallery
 De Ateliers
 Amsterdam School for Cultural Analysis
 Artist's Personal Website

South African painters
South African male painters
Living people
1976 births